Nepenthes abalata is a tropical pitcher plant known from three western islands of the Philippines: Culion, Cuyo, and Malalison. It has been recorded from coastal grassland and scrub at elevations of 0–20 m above sea level.

The specific epithet abalata may be translated as "from alata" and refers to the historical lumping of N. abalata with the widespread and highly variable N. alata.

References

 Galang, R. 2014. The discovery of Drosera burmannii on Malalison Island, Culasi Municipality, Antique Province Philippines. Planta Carnivora 36(1): 34–42. 
 Mey, F.S. 2013. Neotypification of Nepenthes blancoi and description of N. abalata a new species from the Philippines. Strange Fruits: A Garden's Chronicle, February 11, 2013.
 Smith, L. 2014. Pitcher perfect - but carnivorous plants are at risk. The Independent, January 5, 2014. 

Carnivorous plants of Asia
abalata
Endemic flora of the Philippines
Plants described in 2013
Taxa named by Martin Cheek
Taxa named by Matthew Jebb